Syllitus pseudocupes is a species of beetle in the family Cerambycidae. It was described by Fairmaire and Germain in 1864.

References

Stenoderini
Beetles described in 1864